The Susuami language is a heavily endangered Papuan language, spoken in the resettlement village of Manki along the upper Watut River, Morobe Province, Papua New Guinea.

Demographics
In 1980, it was estimated at 50 speakers, and faced competition from the several other languages spoken in the village, including distantly-related Hamtai and Angaataha, as well as the usual use of Tok Pisin with outsiders.

In 1990, there are about a dozen speakers, and children were not learning the language, including the child of the only couple in the village who were both native speakers. Its continued survival is unlikely.

References

 Bernard Comrie, Stephen Matthews, and Maria Polinsky. The Atlas of Languages. New York: Facts on File. Page 109.
 Smith, Geoffrey P. 1990. Susuami: An Angan Language of the Upper Watut Valley, Morobe Province, Papua New Guinea. Lae: Department of Language and Communication Studies, Papua New Guinea University of Technology.

Angan languages
Critically endangered languages
Languages of Morobe Province
Endangered Papuan languages